This is a list of airports in Paraguay, sorted by location.



Airports 

Airport names shown in bold indicate the airport has scheduled service on commercial airlines.

See also 
 List of the busiest airports in Paraguay
 Transportation in Paraguay
 List of airports by ICAO code: S#SG - Paraguay

References 

Paraguay
 
Airports
Airports
Paraguay